James M. Dinwiddie House, also known as Maple Grove Stock Farm, is a historic home located near Dover, Lafayette County, Missouri.  It was built about 1840, and is a two-story, central passage plan, vernacular Greek Revival style brick I-house. It has a one-story rear ell. The front facade features a classic one-story portico.

It was listed on the National Register of Historic Places in 1997.

References

Houses on the National Register of Historic Places in Missouri
Greek Revival houses in Missouri
Houses completed in 1840
Houses in Lafayette County, Missouri
National Register of Historic Places in Lafayette County, Missouri